Western Australia has the longest coastline of any state or territory in Australia, at 10,194 km or 12,889 km (20,781 km including islands). It is a significant portion of the coastline of Australia, which is 35,877 km (59,736 km including islands).

The earliest full charting of the coastline occurred during exploration in the late eighteenth and early nineteenth centuries.

The coastline has some features or organisms that are found on the entire length, while some others are specific to particular coastal regions.

Various government map posters have been created over time, which have examples of coastal form, or types of coast such as the 1984 map with photos.

Integrated Marine and Coastal Regionalisation of Australia (IMCRA)
The IMCRA has offshore regions delineated in a systematic appraisal of ecology and geography.

Coastal regions used in weather reports
Standard Bureau of Meteorology reports include the following reference points for coastal weather reports:

North Kimberley Coast: WA/NT border (or to Kuri Bay
West Kimberley Coast: Kuri Bay to Wallal (Kimberley land region)
Pilbara Coast East: Wallal Downs to Cape Preston (Pilbara land region)
Pilbara Coast West: Cape Preston to North West Cape (Pilbara land region)
Ningaloo Coast: Northwest Cape to Carnarvon (Gascoyne land region)
Gascoyne Coast: north of Carnarvon to Kalbarri (Gascoyne land region)
Geraldton Coast: north of Kalbarri to Jurien Bay (Central west land region)
Lancelin Coast: Jurien Bay to Two Rocks (Lower west land region)
Perth Local Waters: Two Rocks to Dawesville (Lower west land region and/or Perth Metropolitan region)
Perth Coast:west of Rottnest and Perth Local Waters (same limits of Two Rocks and Dawesville)
Bunbury Geographe Coast: Dawesville to Busselton, (part lower west and part south west land region)
Leeuwin Coast: Busselton to west of Denmark (South west land region)
Albany Coast: west of Denmark to Bremer Bay (south coast coastal land region)
Esperance Coast: Bremer Bay to Israelite Bay (Southeast coastal land region)
Eucla Coast: Israelite Bay to SA Border (Eucla land region)

General coastal regions
There are groupings for wider regions that are based very close to the land regions; one made in the 1980s has 8 coastal regions, while the 2003 Coastal Planning and Management Manual has five regions with component sections:

 Kimberley Coast: Northern Territory / Western Australia border to Broome (2003 manual, figure 2-2 Pilbara Kimberley Region)
  Canning: Broome to Port Hedland (Cape Keraudren – east of the De Grey River delta in the 2003 manual)
  Pilbara Coast: Port Hedland to Onslow
  Coral Coast or Gascoyne region – Onslow to Kalbarri (Shark Bay in the 2003 manual)
  Kalbarri to Cape Naturaliste: which includes, Batavia Coast, the Central West also known as the Turquoise Coast and another further south known at the Sunset Coast
 South West Capes: Cape Naturaliste to Cape Leeuwin (to Albany in the 2003 manual)
  South Coast: Cape Leeuwin to Israelite Bay – incorporates the coastal region between Cape Leeuwin and Windy Harbour, usually considered part of the south west
 South Coast Region or the South East: Israelite Bay (Albany in the 2003 manual) to the Western Australia / South Australian border (Eucla)

Ports, settlements and towns

Fisheries bioregions
Under the Fish Resources Management Act 1994 there are four main regions on the Western Australian coast.

North Coast (Pilbara/Kimberley): from the Western Australian and Northern Territory border to 114° 50' E 21° 46' S, just west of the mouth of the Ashburton River
Gascoyne Coast: from 114° 50' E 21° 46' S, just west of the mouth of the Ashburton River Mouth to 27° S – about halfway between Kalbarri and Denham
West Coast: from 27° S: about halfway between Kalbarri and Denham south to 115 ° 30' E – Black Point east of Cape Leeuwin
South Coast: from 115 ° 30' E: Black Point east of Cape Leeuwin, to the South Australian Border

Features
The coastal regions include a range of beaches, cliffs, and coastline features that are dependent upon the underlying geology; the geological provinces have direct relationship to the coastal forms:

 Eucla Basin – Eucla – Israelite Bay – Limestone
 Yilgarn Craton – Point Malcolm – Cape Arid and Point Hood to Point D'Entrecasteaux
 Bremer Basin – Israelite Bay – Point D'Entrecasteaux
 Perth Basin – Augusta – Murchison River
 Carnarvon Basin –  Murchison River – Cape Preston
 Pilbara craton –  Cape Preston – Port Hedland
 Canning Basin –   Port Hedland – King Sound
 Kimberley Basin – Kimberley Coast
 Bonaparte Basin –  Cambridge Gulf

Gulfs 
 Admiralty Gulf
 Cambridge Gulf
 Exmouth Gulf
 Joseph Bonaparte Gulf

Sounds 
Specifically referring to Sound (geography)

 Camden Sound
 Cockburn Sound
 King Sound
 Yampi Sound
 York Sound
 King George Sound

Archipelagoes and island groups 
 Archipelago of the Recherche
 Bonaparte Archipelago
 Buccaneer Archipelago
 Houtman Abrolhos
 Monte Bello Islands
 Thevenard Island
 Direction Island (Exmouth Gulf)

Aquatic flora
The Western Australian coastline has the greatest diversity of seagrasses in the world, and the meadows they form are among the largest on earth.

Amphibolis antarctica, Wireweed, Sea Nymph
Amphibolis griffithii
Halophila australis
Halophila decipiens
Halophila ovalis, Paddle Weed, Sea Wrack
Heterozostera tasmanica
Posidonia angustifolia
Posidonia australis, Fireball Weed
Posidonia coriacea
Posidonia denhartogii
Posidonia robertsoniae
Posidonia sinuosa
Syringodium isoetifolium
Thalassodendron pachyrhizum

See also
Australian context
Geology of Australia

Local features
List of islands of Western Australia, 0–9, A–C and subsequent sections
List of watercourses in Western Australia

Regional divisions
Interim Biogeographic Regionalisation for Australia
Ecoregions in Australia
Regions of Western Australia

Plants and natural history
Seagrasses of Western Australia

Notes

References

Further reading

Flora
 Rippey, Elizabeth and Rowland, Barbara (2004) Coastal Plants: Perth and the south-west region Second Edition, Crawley, W.A.  University of Western Australia Press.

Conferences
 WA State Coastal Conference (3rd : 2005 : Mandurah, Bunbury and Busselton, W.A.)
Title 	3rd WA State Coastal Conference, Mandurah – Bunbury – Busselton, November 2005 : coastal solutions : balancing the waves of change : program and papers. Canning Bridge, W.A. : Promaco Conventions Pty Ltd, 2005.

Locations
 Murray, Ian and Marion Hercock (2008) Where on the Coast is That? Victoria Park, Western Australia. Hesperian Press.

Government reports
Department of Conservation and Land Management, 1994: A Representative Marine Reserves
System for Western Australia: Report of the Marine Parks and Reserves Selection Working Group (the Wilson Report).
Government of Western Australia, 1998: New Horizons: the Way Ahead in Marine Conservation and Management.
Government of Western Australia, 2002b: Focus on the Future: the Western Australian State Sustainability Strategy, Consultation Draft.
Government of Western Australia, 2002c: A Biodiversity Conservation Act for Western Australia, Consultation Paper.
Western Australian Planning Commission, 2001: Coastal Zone Management Policy for Western Australia, for public comment.
Western Australian Planning Commission, 2002: Coastal Planning Program – Status of Coastal Planning in Western Australia 2001/02.
Western Australian Planning Commission, 2003a: Statement of Planning Policy No. 2.6: StateCoastal Planning Policy.
Western Australian Planning Commission, 2003b: Coastal Planning and Management Manual

 
.
C